The First Labour Government of New Zealand was the government of New Zealand from 1935 to 1949. Responsible for the realisation of a wide range of progressive social reforms during its time in office, it set the tone of New Zealand's economic and welfare policies until the 1980s, establishing a welfare state, a system of Keynesian economic management, and high levels of state intervention. The government came to power towards the end of, and as a result of, the Great Depression of the 1930s, and also governed the country throughout World War II.

Significant policies

Industrial
 Significant improvements in working conditions took place, partly through greater competition for labour and partly through legislative provisions.
 Enacted compulsory trade unionism (1936).
 A Factories Act amendment introduced a 40-hour, five-day working week, with eight public holidays: Christmas Day, Boxing Day, New Year's Day, Good Friday, Easter Monday, Anzac Day, Labour Day, and sovereign's birthday. Legislation in 1945 and 1946 made the new 40-hour workweek almost universal, in industry as well as in shops and offices.
 Relief jobs were abolished and in 1936 and 1937, sustenance payment took the place of relief work, and during those years an average of 20,000 received it.
 Sustenance rates of pay were increased by amounts of up to 100% "to provide the transition to full employment on public works." On rate of payment for all was also introduced, replacing the three different pre-existing levels in which urban workers received higher sustenance payments than Māori (who received the lowers rate of sustenance) and those living in secondary towns.
 The Arbitration Court's compulsory powers were restored (1936), with preference given to unionists "and for all workers subject to a particular Court award to become members of the trade union to which the award applied." Provision was also made for the registration of national trade unions. This new, more progressive system led to improvements in the pay and working conditions of New Zealanders who had never had a trade union to represent them.
 The Agricultural Workers Act (1936) improved conditions for rural labourers by setting a minimum rate of pay and required a decent level of living conditions. The legislation restricted the employment of children under the age of fifteen on dairy farms, introduced minimum standards of housing accommodation for farm workers, four weeks of paid annual holiday, and a minimum wage for farm workers.
 The Shops and Officers Amendment Act (1936) specified a maximum workweek of forty-four hours for people working in banks and insurance.
 The Industrial Efficiency Bill (enacted in October 1936) gave the government wide powers to regulate industries.
 A large public works programme was initiated to provide employment on full wages instead of relief.
 The Industrial Conciliation and Arbitration Act (1936) restored full jurisdiction to the Arbitration Court and required the court to make general orders fixing basic wages for both men and women which would apply to all awards and agreements in force.
 Compulsory arbitration was restored. This expanded the range of minimum standards of pay and working conditions, benefiting the semi-skilled, those without craft training, and unorganised groups of workers.
 Between 1935 and 1938, trade union membership rose to a figure "nearly two and half times that of the peak year of 1929," encouraged by the Labour government's industrial policies.
 In 1936, the government graduated the wages of young people so that year by year their rate of pay automatically increased until it reached a minimum standard wage when they reached the age of 21. The aims of this were to prevent adult wage rates from being undercut by young male or young female labour, to prevent the exploitation of young people's labour and lack of bargaining power, and to prevent employers from sacking apprentices as they became qualified for journeymen's pay.
 Relief workers were granted award wages.
 The Court of Arbitration was required in 1936 to lay down in its awards and agreements a basic wage sufficient to keep a man, his wife and three children "in a fair and reasonable standard of comfort".
 A Profiteering Prevention Act was passed (1936).
 The Minister of Mines was empowered to establish central rescue stations in mines (1936).
 Improved rates of compensation were introduced for injured workers (1936).
 Penal rates of pay were introduced for weekend work and overtime (1936).
 The Minimum Wage Act (1945) established a minimum wage for all workers aged twenty-one and above.
 Legislative provision was made in 1944 for an annual two weeks holiday for all workers.
 Underground mine workers were granted a seven-hour workday in 1948 and 1949.
 Compensation was increased for the dependents of deceased workers (1936).
 The Wages Protection and Contractors Liens Act (1939) safeguarded the wages of certain types of workers mostly in construction projects by making various provisions "to ensure priority of payment of wages over other claims against principals, contractors, or subcontractors".
 The Government Railways Act (1949) established a Government Railways Industrial Tribunal with the power to stipulate salaries and wage rates, hours of work, and other conditions of employment for railway workers.
 The government experimented with cooperative shops in the rapidly expanding post-war suburbs.
 A National Employment Service was established (1946) with the principal function of promoting and maintaining full employment.
 A Home Aid Service was established (1946).
 A new Factories Act (1946) took measures against sweating and contained detailed provisions regarding workplace safety, dangerous liquids, protection from machinery, means of access, and fire-escapes.
 During the war years, the government's financial and economic policies ensured that all New Zealanders had a reasonable minimum of what was available while scarce goods (both imported and domestically produced) were rationed in the public interest.
 The wages of the lowest-paid workers were allowed to rise to a minimum level (1944).
 The Bush Workers Act (1945) made provision for the protection and safety of bush workers.
 Amendments were made to the Workers' Compensation Act (1947), one making it compulsory for an employer to insure against his liability under the Act, and another making workers' compensation insurance (with certain exceptions) a monopoly of the State Fire Insurance Office.

Foreign affairs and military
In the 1930s, Labour was a supporter of the League of Nations (a forerunner to the United Nations), seeing the League as the best way to prevent another major war. However the League proved to be ineffectual, and was unable to prevent the Japanese invasion of Manchuria or the Italian invasion of Abyssinia. Under Labour, the New Zealand representative in the League spoke strongly against appeasement of aggressors, particularly the Italian invasion of Abyssinia and the German occupation of Czechoslovakia. When World War II broke out, New Zealand immediately declared war on Germany, with Savage saying that 'where Britain goes, we go'. During the war, conscription was introduced. This led some to accuse Labour of hypocrisy, as it had strongly opposed conscription in World War I. The government argued that while the First World War had been an unnecessary imperialist scuffle, the Second World War was a just war against fascist aggressors. Following the war, Fraser became involved in the setting up of the United Nations, and was especially concerned that small countries not be marginalised by the great powers.
Peacetime conscription was introduced in 1949, which proved to be an unpopular decision.

Economic
 Government spending was increased in an effort to stimulate the economy.
 The Finance Act (1936) required the reversal of all cuts made in wages and salaries during the Depression period .
 The Mortgages Corporation was renamed the State Advances Corporation in 1936 to provide cheap, long-term, urban and rural financing on first mortgages. It was also provided with the powers to lend to local authorities for the construction of workers' housing and to make advances for developing existing industries and for setting up new ones.
 The Reserve Bank of New Zealand was immediately nationalised, transferring control from private bankers to the Minister of Finance.
 The Reserve Bank Amendment Act (1936) bought out the Bank's private shareholding of £500,000.
 The Bank of New Zealand was nationalised (1945).
 A State Advances Corporation Act was set up which stimulated house-building and provided cheap loans to farmers.
 A Bureau of Industry was established (1936) to plan new industries and reorganise existing ones by a system of licensing.
 The New Zealand National Airways Act (1945) brought internal airways into public ownership in line with previous government participation in the overseas Tasman Empire Airways.
 Large-scale hydro-electric installations were built on South Island rivers and lakes.
 Introduced wide-ranging tariffs and other import controls.
 The graduated land tax was reintroduced at high rates.
 The top rate of income tax was significantly increased, from 42.9% (and 57% for 'unearned income' such as rent, interest or dividends) in 1939 to 76.5% by 1949.
 The 1942 budget, which raised taxes, marked the beginnings of Keynesian thinking being explicitly followed in New Zealand.
 Various attempts at government planning were made. The Industrial Efficiency Act of 1936 established a Bureau of Industry to guide the Minister of Industries and Commerce on planning and development, whilst the Organisation for National Development was set up in 1944 with the aim of studying and making plans for a post-war society.
 Import and exchange controls were introduced in response to exhausting sterling reserves.
 A comprehensive price stabilisation scheme was introduced during the Second World War, with subsidies on staples like bread and butter.
 Price controls, introduced even before the war, were further extended in 1943 to cover the retail prices of many kinds of fruit and vegetables, and towards the end of 1943, in the light of a substantial increase of land-transfer transactions, controls were placed on sales and leases of land, with the general objective of stabilising values at 1942 levels.
 Via the 1944 Milk Act, the government extended a guaranteed price at a sufficient and attractive level to town milk suppliers to divert milk from butter and cheese production for urban supply.
 In 1947, dairy farmers were provided with a joint industry and a government Marketing Commission with an independent chairman and the power to fix the guaranteed price and control their own marketing overseas.
 The Sharemilking Agreements Act 1937 made provision for safeguarding the interests of sharemilkers under sharemilking agreements.
 A Meat Stabilisation Account (established in 1942) built up large reserves which were used after the war for various forms of assistance to farmers.
 Land development schemes were pushed ahead and the area being developed was greatly extended.
 Coal mines gradually came under public ownership.
 An Organisation for National Security was established (1937), with officials preparing sets of controls to be implemented in the case of war breaking out. During the Second World War, price controls were extended to prevent profiteering and subsidies on various foodstuffs were introduced.
 Several amendments to the wartime Economic Stabilisation Regulations after 1942 were made to enable some levelling-up of wages for poorly paid workers.
 Wartime inflation was successfully controlled, with prices rising by only 14% during the Second World War.
 Commercial radio stations were purchased by the government (1938), which subsequently acquired the sole right to radio advertising.
 Abolished the "head tax" imposed on Chinese immigrants.

Health
 Most fees for health care were removed, and as noted by the historian William Ball Sutch, "By the end of 1941 there were not only free hospital and maternity attention, free medicines and drugs, and essentially a free medical practitioner service, and, as a gesture to specialist services, free X-ray diagnosis".
 Free inpatient treatment for the whole population was introduced (1939).
 Free outpatient treatment, free pharmaceuticals, and part payment of general practitioners' bills were introduced (1941).
 The introduction (in 1941) of the Pharmaceutical Supplies Benefit provided for a wide range of drugs to be supplied free on the prescription of a registered medical practitioner.
 Further health care benefits were introduced during the course of the Second World War, including physiotherapy benefits (1942), district nursing (1944), and laboratory diagnostic benefits (1946). A subsidy was also provided to organisations supplying home aids.
 Free maternity care was introduced.
 The School Dental Nurse Service (originally introduced in 1920) was significantly expanded and free dental treatment was introduced for adolescents.
 Free x-rays were introduced (1941).
 From 1947 onwards, hospital outpatients could be provided with facilities such contact lenses and hearing aids.
 From 1948 onwards, artificial limbs were provided free.
 The Tuberculosis Act (1948) introduced measures for controlling this disease.
 The Physical Welfare and Recreation Act (1937) provided for central government "to grant sport facilities money to local governments and allowed local government to spend money on these facilities".
 The Soil Conservation and Rivers Control Act (1941) established the concept of comprehensive catchment planning and management.
 The Health (Burial) Regulations (1946) control the handling and burial of dead bodies, the operation of mortuaries and the registration of funeral directors. With regards to mortuaries, the Regulations specified the need to adequately and conveniently provide hot and cold water services. References to the water supply in the legislation are made within the context of cleaning washing.
 The general rise in living standards encouraged by the first labour Government's social and economic policies led to a significant rise in the health and well-being of the population as a whole. Deaths from typhoid fever, rheumatic fever, diphtheria, appendicitis, influenza, and tuberculosis fell dramatically, which the average life expectancy increased. In addition, the infant mortality rate fell, from 32.26 to 22.75 for Pakeha and from 109.20 to 69.74 for Māori.

Welfare
 The government provided the unemployed and the recipients of charitable aid with a Christmas bonus upon taking office.
 At the start of 1936 (following a decision made by the newly elected Labour cabinet in December 1935), a special grant consisting of a week's pay was introduced for the unemployed, together with an additional amount for those in receipt of outdoor relief.
 A landlord's power to distrain on the goods of a tenant “as a means of ejecting him for non-payment of rent without reference to the Court” was removed (1936).
 Increased retiring allowances were provided for New Zealanders who had compulsorily retired during the Great Depression (1936).
 The Unemployment Fund was replaced by an Employment Promotion Fund (1936).
 War pensions were increased, together with other pensions and allowances (1936).
 Mothers were authorised to make applications for family allowances instead of that right being restricted to fathers (1936).
 The old age pension was restored.
 Eligibility for the old age pension was reduced from twenty-five years of residence in New Zealand to twenty (1936).
 A Parliamentary Commission visited the Rarotongan group to investigate and report on conditions on those islands (1936).
 Aid was provided to agricultural labourers.
 The Pension Amendment Act (1936) extended pensions to a wider section of the population, including Lebanese, Chinese, invalids, and deserted wives.
 The Social Security Act of 1938 introduced a comprehensive system of social security which was, according to one authority, “the first comprehensive and integrated system of social security in the western world”. The rates of family allowances and of existing benefits for the unemployed, miners, invalids, widows, the blind, and the aged were increased. The qualifying age for old-age benefits was reduced from 65 to 60. Family allowances were extended. New welfare benefits were introduced for orphans and those whose incomes had ceased on account of sickness. Provision was made for emergency benefits for persons suffering hardship who were not entitled to any other benefits. The 1938 Social Security Act also made some small improvement in the family allowance, including the abolition of the ineligibility of “Aliens, Asiatics, and Illegitimates.”
 Universal Superannuation, a universal benefit for all New Zealanders aged sixty-five and above, was introduced (1940).
 Payments for deserted wives were introduced.
 Old age and war pensions were increased (1936).
 Deserted wives with children became eligible for widows benefit if they had taken maintenance proceedings against their husbands and were not divorced (1936). Eligibility was later extended to deserted wives whose husband's whereabouts were known (1943) and to deserted wives who had no dependent children (1945).
 Employed unmarried pregnant women became eligible for an emergency sickness benefit for a limited period before and after giving birth, on the grounds that they were temporarily unable to go to work (1938).
 The rate of family allowance was doubled and renamed Family Benefit (1938).
 In 1938, George V memorial funds were used to set up health camps across the country to improve child health (these camps became less necessary as the health of children generally improved during the course of the Fifth Labour Government).
 The age at women were entitled to receive old-age pensions was reduced from 65 to 60.
 A supplementary benefit for widows with children was introduced (1945).
 Widows benefits were extended to widows without children (1945).
 The age limit for the family allowance was extended from 15 to 16 years (1939).
 Family allowances, originally payable to the second child onwards, were gradually to the whole population. In 1940, the child allowance was extended to the second child and in 1941 the family benefit was extended to all children in families earning less than £5 a week. Universal family benefits were later introduced in 1946. As a result of this expansion of coverage, the number of families in receipt of these payments rose from 42,600 to 230,000. Also, because of deductions for dependants, family men paid less in income tax, and received more benefits.
 An improved invalid pension for the totally blind and incapacitated was established (1936).
 Compensation was increased for the dependants of deceased workers (1936).
 The state housing programme was launched, providing rental houses for low-income workers.
 Farmers were provided with guaranteed prices for their produce.
 The Mortgagors and Lessees Rehabilitation Act (1936) provided relief to farmers mired in mortgage debt.
 Domestic Assistance benefits were introduced (1944) to provide assistance during a mother's incapacity, or in cases of hardship. The services were to be supplied through some approved organisation.
 The State Advances Department (later Corporation) introduced quality controls for all houses it helped to finance. The government set new standards in design and construction, experimented with area planning, constructed some impressive apartment buildings, and democratised the bungalow.
 The government effectively tackled the housing crisis at that time, with a new Department of Housing Construction building 3,445 houses within three years. From 1937 to 1949, nearly 29,000 state houses were built.
 A 'needy families' scheme, administered by the Child Welfare Branch, was established (1941). This scheme provided assistance, primarily by re-housing large or poor families to maintain the household unit, and had assisted over 900 families and more than 5000 children by 1946.
 A Fair Rents Act was passed (1936) with the intention of prohibiting excessive rents. It prevented rents from being increased unless a magistrate agreed.
 Between 1939 and 1943, the widow's benefit was increased from 20.6% of the nominal wage rate to 22.4%.
 In 1942, the rates paid for means-tested benefits were increased with a 5% cost of living bonus when it was noted by the government that inflation was eroding the real value of social security benefits.
 Regular increases were made to the family benefit during the course of the Second World War which went beyond the wartime prices index and raised the purchasing power of families with children. In May 1942, it represented 5.6% of the male nominal age rate, in July 1943, 6.7%, and in October 1944, 8.8%. By October that year, these increases meant the weekly income of an average wage-earner had been increased by 17.6% if the family had two children.
 In 1945, benefit rates were substantially raised, including a supplementary amount for widows with children. The benefits for widowhood, unemployment, sickness, invalidity, and age were raised to 32% of nominal age rates (1945).
 Pensions were extended to all New Zealanders over the age of sixty-five and were gradually increased to the level of subsistence (1940). Unemployment and other benefits were later increased to the same level (1945).
 The Housing Improvement Act (1945) authorised the making of regulations prescribing the standard of fitness of homes and bestowed upon local health inspectorates the power to require repair or demolition of substandard dwellings.
 The Housing Improvement Regulations (1947) set minimum standards of fitness for houses. In regards to the kitchen area, the regulations specify that there shall be an approved sink with a tap connected to an adequate supply of potable water. In terms of bathing facilities, bathrooms require a bath or shower with an adequate supply of wholesome water. The regulations also sought to prevent overcrowding.
 At the point of discharge, service personnel were provided with a gratuity of 2s6d for every day spent overseas and 8d per day for service in new Zealand. The money was paid into a Post office Savings Bank Account and received a 5% bonus each 31 March on the sum remaining in the account. Nearly £23 million was paid out in gratuities.
 A war veteran's allowance was introduced for ex-servicemen unable to work because of any kind of infirmity. Pensions were also introduced for disabled ex-servicemen.
 A National Employment Service helped service personnel to find civilian employment.
 A Rehabilitation Department was established in 1943. Service personnel were eased back into civilian life through a wide range of assistance schemes involving housing and furniture loans (with a total of 64,000 being granted, while another 18,000 returnees were allocated state houses), business (11,500 were granted loans), land settlement schemes (with 12,5000 settled), university bursaries and general educational assistance (with 27,000 beneficiaries), and trade-training (with 11,000 returnees provided with assistance.
 Generous tax breaks and low-cost housing loans at 3% interest from 1946 onwards were introduced for young couples.
 The Superannuation Act of 1947 introduced a contributory superannuation scheme for members of the House of Representatives.
 To prepare for returning servicemen looking for farms and houses, the Servicemen's Settlement and Land Sales Act (1943) provided the government with the power to acquire land suitable for subdivision and to control prices in all land sales.
 An extensive rehabilitation scheme for returned servicemen was set up after the war, with the development of farms for ex-servicemen, equipped with house constructed on state house plans, modified for their farm house function by including porches for outdoor clothing and boots. In the cities, ex-servicemen were given priority for jobs and state houses, while new "pressure cooker" courses at universities and teachers colleges provided men with opportunities unavailable before the war. The rehabilitation scheme also provided opportunities for Māori ex-servicemen.
 From 1947 to 1949, the percentage of total government expenditure on social security benefits rose from 26.8% to 28.2%.

Education
 Most fees for secondary education were removed.
 The age at which children could commence school from six years to five years was restored (1936).
 Five-year-olds who had been kept from school as an economy measure were readmitted.
 A "new freedom" was introduced in primary schools, with an attempt made to diminish formal instruction in the elementary years of schooling and replace it by experiential learning.
 The Proficiency Examination was abolished (1938) to enable all pupils to proceed to full secondary schooling. This widened entry to secondary education and provided greater flexibility to the primary curriculum.
 Cuts in teachers' salaries were reversed and unemployed teachers moved back into teaching so that class sizes could fall.
 Grants to kindergartens and adult education were restored and spending on bus transport for isolated pupils, the correspondence system, Māori education, libraries, crafts, materials, and school maintenance was increased.
 Free post primary education was introduced for everyone up until the age of 19.
 A National Library Service was set up (1938) and the government built or improved many country libraries with the help of the American Carnegie Foundation.
 A School Publications Branch of the Education Department was established (1939).
Free secondary education was made compulsory for everyone under the age of fifteen (1944).
 University education was made more affordable and widely available.
 Adult education was promoted, as exemplified by the establishment of the National Council for Adult Education (1938) and the provision of a government subsidy to the Workers' Educational Association from 1937 onwards.
 The curriculum was revamped, with new subjects such as social studies introduced in 1945 to replace the old rote-learned geography and history, and science and maths teaching were overhauled.
 Surplus apples were provided to schoolchildren from 1941 to 1945.
 A free school milk scheme was introduced (1937). This was extended during the Second World War.
 A broader primary school curriculum was developed.
 The Teachers' Colleges were reopened.
 Spending on staff, facilities, and assistance to students was increased.
 The number of kindergartens and parent-run play centres for pre-schoolers was increased.
 The education vote was increased.
 Rural schools were consolidated in larger, more efficient establishments.
 Free textbooks for primary school students were introduced (1943).
 The school-leaving age was raised from 14 to 15 (1944).
 A Literary Fund was established in 1946 to subsidise the arts and to assist writers.
 Free travel facilities were extended to children living in the countryside.
 The boarding allowance was significantly increased.
 A horseback allowance was introduced.
 The correspondence school broadened its activities to include hundreds more pupils.
 Broadcasts to schoolchildren were extended.
 The general curriculum was widened "in keeping with the newer concept of paying attention to the developmental needs of the growing child".
 A Country Library Service was established (1938) to improve the stock of books in rural libraries at a low cost while also encouraging the provision of free libraries in country towns. The establishment of this service led to greater provision of library facilities in rural areas, with new stocks of books acquired at low cost and the establishment of free libraries maintained by town boards and borough councils. A National Library Service followed later on (in 1945) with the establishment of a library school and a National Library Centre.
 The establishment of the Library Centre and National Library Service maintained a flow of well-trained librarians, increased the quantity and quality of available books, and increased the number of library research facilities.
 The writing of historical books was commissioned (1940) to celebrate New Zealand's centenary.
 State support was provided for music, literature, drama, ballet, and the plastic arts, while grants were introduced for students of these fields who wished to undertake further study.
 An extensive school-building programme was launched.
 Social studies, music, and art were included in the secondary school curriculum.
 A National Orchestra was established.
 Government grants to the Free Kindergarten and to the Workers' Educational Association were restored.
  The Apprentices Act (1948) provided for the appointment of a Commissioner of Apprenticeship to improve and supervise the training and education of apprentices throughout the country, and to foster collaboration between the Department of Education and the schools on the one hand, and the Department of Labour and the trades on the other.
 The Adult Education Act (1947) set up a National Council of Adult Education with the mandate "to promote and foster adult education and the cultivation of the arts."
 The Trades Certification Act (1948) authorised the establishment of a Trades Certification Board chaired by a nominee of the Minister of Education to develop examinations for apprentices.
 The School Publications Branch of the Education Department was created (1939) to produce high-quality schoolbooks "having the new Zealand environment as its background." The impact of the work carried out by this branch was such that according to the historian William Ball Sutch,

“These books and the work of the Branch became internationally famous for high standards of scholarship, humanity, editing, and presentation; and advisors from the Branch subsequently helped other countries set up their schemes of educational publications".

Constitutional
 Passed the Statute of Westminster Adoption Act 1947, to adopt the Statute of Westminster 1931. This Act was a significant step to the Independence of New Zealand, technically New Zealand ceased to be the Dominion of New Zealand and became the Realm of New Zealand, and was fully able to direct its own foreign affairs and military. It also legally separated the British Crown from a New Zealand Crown, meaning that the New Zealand monarchy became legally independent of the British monarchy, and thus the King became King of New Zealand (the first monarch to be declared as such was Queen Elizabeth II in 1952).
 Abolished the country quota (effective for the ) so that rural and urban electorates contained the same number of voters.
 The Political Disabilities Removal Act 1936  provided civil servants with full political rights and freedom of speech (1936).
 Whipping in Children's Courts was abolished (1936).
 The definition of a child by New Zealand law was extended to include adopted or illegitimate children by Section 26 of the Statutes Amendment Act, 1936. 
 The government allowed women to be appointed to the Legislative Council in 1941, and two were appointed in 1946, Mary Anderson and Mary Dreaver.
 Women were allowed to become members of the police force (1938).
 Women between the ages of 25 and 60 were allowed to serve on juries if they wished to do so (1942).
 Licensing Amendment Act: A Licensing Commission was established (1948) to supervise the manufacture and sale of alcohol.
 The Main Highways Board was brought under the control of the Minister of Public Works. The principle highways were subsequently nationalised (1936) to ensure that” the main arteries of road traffic were the sole responsibility of the state”.
 The Broadcasting Board, the Transport Co-ordination Board, and the Railways Board were abolished (1936).

Māori
 The term 'Native' was replaced with 'Māori' in official usage, including the Minister of Māori Affairs, in all official documents from 1946 onwards.
 Māori were provided with equality of financial treatment in standard rates of pay on public works, unemployment benefit, and sustenance payments.
 Māori living standards were considerably improved. The secret ballot was introduced for Māori citizens, unemployment benefits and opportunities for housing finance were equalised, spending on Māori education and health was increased, social security provision was improved and the first Māori welfare officers were provided, and contentious land claims in the South island and Waikato were settled.
 The well-being of Māori improved as a result of the extension of health services by the Department of Health, the improvement of public health standards, and the expansion of land development schemes.
 Māori housing standards were significantly improved. The government provided funding for the Native Housing Act (passed by the coalition government in 1935) in 1937. By 1940, 1,592 new houses were provided by this measure as well as under the land development schemes. By 1951, 3,051 homes (16% of Māori homes) had been constructed. The number of occupied huts and whare fell from 4,676 in 1936 to 2,275 in 1951, the number of camps and tents from 1,528 to 568, and overcrowded houses and shacks from 71% to 32% of all Māori houses.
 Spectacular improvements in Māori health took place.
 Māori children benefited from the general upgrading of the education system.
 The Māori Social and Economic Advancement Act (1945) established tribal committees and executives, from the marae to the regional level, concerned especially with welfare and marae administration. Welfare officers were appointed to the Department of Māori Affairs, and Māori wardens were given welfare functions under tribal committees. By 1949, there were 381 committees and 63 tribal executives.
 Attempts were made to promote race relations by educating young Pakeha teachers about Māori culture.
 The Native Affairs Department was replaced with the Māori Affairs Department (1947).
 Welfare officers and Māori wardens were appointed who came to play a major role both in the cities and in tribal areas as Māori started to move from remote pa to provincial towns.
 Māori enrolment in public primary schools administered by education boards was significantly increased.
 Rural secondary education for Māori was improved by the construction of eight Māori district high schools between 1941 and 1951, with emphasis on vocational training, especially metalwork and woodwork.
 Cuts in Māori Education Scholarships were reversed (1936).
 The development of Māori land and housing was accelerated, a start was made on trade training, and Māori access to education was significantly expanded.
 More spending was devoted to Māori schools than to European ones.
 Conditions of eligibility and rates of widows benefit differed for Māori until 1945.
 Māori were granted the same unemployment payments as the Pakeha.
 The government gradually brought Māori pensions (traditionally lower than the Pakeha) to the level of white New Zealanders.
 Between 1935 and 1939, the number of Māori land development schemes were doubled, while capital expenditure was increased almost fivefold. By March 1939, £4,300,000 had been spent on Māori land development, and  had been farmed or 'broken in.' The state schemes were of such significance to the well-being of Māoris that it was estimated that about a fifth of the Māori population derived at least part of their livelihood from such schemes.
 A series of settlements were signed with iwi between 1944 and 1946 whose grievances had been unresolved since the 1920s. As a form of compensation for the vast land confiscations of the nineteenth century, the Waikato-Maniapoto Māori Claims Settlement Act 1946 provided a lump sum of £10,000 and annual payments for the next forty-five years to Tainui. Successive settlements allocated £5000 annually to the Taranaki Trust Board for confiscated land and compensation to Ngāi Tahu of £10,000 for thirty years.
 Significant improvements were made in Māori housing and sanitary conditions. Slum clearances took place, thousands of new houses and privies were built, and whole villages were transferred to better sites. These measures led to a reduction in Māori infant mortality rates while increasing Māori life expectancy by 15 to 20 years.

Formation

The immediate context of the 1935 election was the Great Depression which had started in 1929 and affected New Zealand as badly as most other Western countries. Following the 1931 election the Reform and United (also known as Liberal) parties had formed a coalition to deal with it. The Labour Party formed the opposition, arguing that the only way out of the depression was socialism. The coalition government instead supported the economic orthodoxy which was that a balanced budget was of paramount importance and that state spending had to be cut to offset the decline in taxation revenue. They also believed that to provide the unemployed with money without making them work was morally wrong, and so put thousands of unemployed to work on often-pointless 'relief work'. Labour argued that the government needed to increase spending and create real jobs.

By 1935 – after the election had been delayed a year because of the depression – many voters who would not otherwise have trusted Labour were disillusioned with the economic orthodoxy and prepared to try something new. Labour was helped by a change of leadership in 1933, after leader Harry Holland died and was replaced by Michael Joseph Savage, who did not seem to be a frightening communist but rather a kindly uncle figure. Labour achieved an overwhelming victory, taking 53 out of 80 seats. A further two were won by the Māori Ratana movement, which formed an alliance with Labour. Despite the size of its victory, Labour won only 46.1% of the popular vote; the government vote was split between Reform and United, and both parties lost votes on the right to the Democrats and the Country Party.

Carl Berendsen, the head of the Prime Minister's Department later said that the first cabinet consisted of a trio of able men (Savage, Fraser and Nash), a witty and worthy toiler (Semple) and a gaggle of non-entities. Six of the ministers were born in New Zealand, five in Australia, and one each in England and Scotland. More than half of Labour's caucus were new to Parliament. Berendsen wrote that Nash was a poor administrator and organiser, he:
could not bear to make a decision. Papers piled up in his office. They stayed there for days and weeks, or months or years, and sometime forever. ... (and he) devoted a great deal of time and care to "going over these papers" .... He even carried these heirlooms with him to Washington. This habit of holding papers caused serious dislocation of public business.

The 1938 election

The government increased in popularity during its first term, as people felt the benefits of its policies and of economic recovery. It cannot realistically be credited with ending the Depression in New Zealand, as most economic indicators were showing signs of improvement before the 1935 election. However government policies such as an increase in pay for relief workers, job creation and generous education policies did bring major benefits to many. Labour's share of the popular vote increased by nearly 10%, but it did not gain any new seats. While in 1935 the anti-Labour vote had been split between two major and two minor parties, by 1938 the United and Reform parties had merged into the New Zealand National Party, which was able to achieve 40.3% of the popular vote and win 25 seats. The Country and Democrat parties' share of the vote collapsed, with the Country Party losing both its seats. From this point on, New Zealand politics would be dominated by the Labour and National parties.

The 1943 election

The 1943 election was held during World War II, and had been postponed by about two years due to the war. Conscription was a minor issue in the election; although both major parties supported it, some saw Labour as hypocrites as they had strongly opposed conscription during World War I. The issue may have lost Labour some support on the left, to the Democratic Labour Party, which had been formed by dissident Labour MP John A. Lee following his expulsion from the Labour Party. However the new party received only 4.3% of the vote and won no seats. Labour was given significant help by the votes of New Zealand soldiers overseas, who turned an apparent election-night victory for National into one for Labour; Fraser quipped that it was not only North Africa that the Second Division had saved. The election was also notable for the defeat of Māori statesman Āpirana Ngata, by the Labour-Ratana candidate Tiaka Omana. Labour was to hold the four Māori electorates until 1996.

The 1946 election

By 1946 the National Party had gained in strength and credibility. However its support was strongest in rural areas, and in previous elections it had benefited from the country quota, which organised New Zealand electorates so that rural electorates had fewer voters, and therefore rural votes were worth more. In 1945 the government had abolished the quota, which may have cost National the election. Labour gained nearly 4% of the popular vote, but lost three seats, reducing its majority to four. Since the seats it held included the four Māori electorates, the government was said by its opponents to rely on a 'Māori mandate'. It was insinuated that Labour would need to pass unwise pro-Māori policies to stay in power.

Defeat

By 1949 the government had been in power for 14 years, six of them in wartime. It seemed increasingly worn out and uncertain. The three referendums held in 1949 (in addition to the usual referendum on alcohol licensing, which was held in conjunction with every election), were symptomatic of this. Meanwhile, National had announced that it would not repeal any of Labour's welfare state policies, which endeared it to many who had supported and benefitted from these policies but were tired of the government. National won 51.9% of the popular vote and 46 of out the 80 seats in parliament. Labour would be out of power for another eight years, and would not be in government for more than a single term until the 1980s.

Election results

Prime ministers
The government was led by Michael Joseph Savage until his death in 1940. He was succeeded by Peter Fraser, who was Prime Minister for the rest of the government's term. Wilson gives the dates of office-holding as 6 December 1935 to 1 April 1940 for the Savage Ministry (although Savage died on 27 March), and 1 April 1940 to 13 December 1949 for the Fraser Ministry.

Cabinet Ministers

War cabinet
The following is a list of ministers from the "War cabinet" (16 July 1940 – 21 August 1945) and "War administration" (30 June 1942 – 2 October 1942). The other members were the Prime Minister, Minister of Defence, Minister of Finance and Minister of Transport (see above).

See also
 Governments of New Zealand
 New Zealand Labour Party

Notes

References

Further reading

 

Ministries of George V
Ministries of Edward VIII
Ministries of George VI
Labour 1
New Zealand Labour Party
20th century in New Zealand
1935 establishments in New Zealand
1949 disestablishments in New Zealand
Cabinets established in 1935
Cabinets disestablished in 1949